Joseph Douglas Strange (born April 13, 1964) is an American former Major League Baseball infielder who played for several teams from 1989 to 1998.

Amateur career
A native of Greenville, South Carolina, Strange is an alumnus of North Carolina State University, where he played college baseball for the NC State Wolfpack. In 1984, he played collegiate summer baseball with the Falmouth Commodores of the Cape Cod Baseball League.

Professional career
Strange played for six different ballclubs during his career: the Detroit Tigers (1989), Chicago Cubs (1991–1992), Texas Rangers (1993–1994), Seattle Mariners (1995–1996), Montreal Expos (1997), and Pittsburgh Pirates (1998).  He made his Major League Baseball debut on July 13, 1989, and played his final game on September 27, 1998. His career batting average was .233.

Front office career
Strange currently works in the front office for the Pittsburgh Pirates.

References

External links
, or Retrosheet, or Pelota Binaria (Venezuelan Winter League)
Story remembering Strange's role on the 1995 Mariners

1964 births
Living people
American expatriate baseball players in Canada
Baseball players from South Carolina
Bristol Tigers players
Cardenales de Lara players
American expatriate baseball players in Venezuela
Carolina Mudcats players
Chicago Cubs players
Detroit Tigers players
Falmouth Commodores players
Glens Falls Tigers players
Greenville Braves players
Iowa Cubs players
Lakeland Tigers players
Major League Baseball second basemen
Major League Baseball third basemen
Montreal Expos players
Nashville Sounds players
NC State Wolfpack baseball players
Ottawa Lynx players
Pittsburgh Pirates players
Pittsburgh Pirates scouts
Seattle Mariners players
Sportspeople from Greenville, South Carolina
Texas Rangers players
Toledo Mud Hens players
Tucson Toros players